Václav Neckář (born 23 October 1943 in Prague) is a Czech singer and actor. He is best known for his performance as Miloš Hrma in Closely Watched Trains. Between 1978 and 1979 he cooperated with Polish singer Anna Jantar during their performances in Poland and Czechoslovakia (ČSSR).
In 2007, he was accused of having been an StB collaborator from 1978.

From 1968 to 1970 he was a singer in Golden Kids with Marta Kubišová and Helena Vondráčková, and from 1970 a singer in the group Bacily.

In 2011, Neckař described himself as a non-practising Hussite. Following the death of Neckař’s wife Jaroslava in 2015, Rev. David Frýda described him and his wife as strong believers and frequent congregants.

Selected filmography
 Closely Watched Trains (1966)
 Private Torment (1967)
 Little Summer Blues (1968)
 Kulhavý dábel (1968)
 The Incredibly Sad Princess (1968)
 The Lanfier Colony (1969)
 Pan Vok odchází (1979)
 Sing, Cowboy, sing (1981)
 Larks on a String (1990)
 Lady Macbeth von Mzensk (1992)
 Czech Woodstock (2004)

Television
 Písen pro Rudolfa III.: Kreslo (#1.1) (1967)
 Písen pro Rudolfa III.: Muz v redingotu (#1.2) (1967)
 Písen pro Rudolfa III.: Albrecht z Valdstejna (#1.4) (1967)
 Siroká cesta spravedlnosti (1968)
 Písen pro Rudolfa III.: Loupez století (#1.5) (1968)
 Písen pro Rudolfa III.: Hrabe Monte Christo (#1.7) (1968)
 Písen pro Rudolfa III.: Betlém (#1.8) (1968)
 Pan Tau: Pan Tau a tisíc kouzel (#2.7) (1972)
 Bigbít: Povolený rock (1973–84) (#1.23) (1998)
 Dobroty: Dobroty 2 (#1.2) (2001)
 Tenkrát na východe (2004)
 Po stopách hvezd: Marta Kubisová (2008)
 VIP zprávy: Episode#1.23 (2010)
 Top star magazín: Top star magazín (#4.6) (2011)
 Top star magazín: Top star magazín (#4.12) (2011)
 VIP zprávy (2011)
 Show Jana Krause (2011)
 Ceský slavík Mattoni 2011 (2011)
 To byl nás hit: 1. semifinále (#1.9) (2011)
 Ceský lev 2011 (2012)
 Ceny Andel 2011 (2012)
 VIP zprávy: Episode dated 9 March 2012 (2012)
 Panelák: Silvester 2012 (#10.73) (2012)

Selected discography
 Sha-La-La-La-Lee (1966)
 Krokodil Theophil (1973)
 Pár dnů prázdnin (I Hear You Knocking)

References

External links
 
Biography at csfd.cz 

1943 births
Living people
Male actors from Prague
Czech male film actors
Czechoslovak male singers
StB
Recipients of Medal of Merit (Czech Republic)
20th-century Czech male actors
Czech Christians